The AS 24, also known as Véhicule Aeroporte or Tricar Parachutable was a military motorized tricycle produced by Fabrique Nationale de Herstal during the 1960s. A single vehicle was evaluated by the US Army in 1963. 460 were produced, with the majority being used by Belgian parachute troops, notably during Operation Dragon Rouge.

130 returned to service in the French paratrooper units. They were withdrawn from service in 1984, replaced by Lohr Fardier..

Specifications
 Passengers: 4 including Driver
 Weight: 374 lb (170 kg)
 Cargo: 770 lb (350 kg) of men and equipment.
 Height: 2 ft 10 in (85 cm)
 Engine:  Two-cylinder, two-stroke, 15 cubic inch (0.245 litres, 245cc) model FN 24
 Speed:

References

 Fabrique National Model A.S. 24
 Fabrique Nationale d’Armes de Guerre 3-Wheelers.com
 AS24 Schwimmwagen.free.fr

Military vehicles of Belgium
Three-wheeled motor vehicles
Military vehicles introduced in the 1960s